Risto Johannes Kuntsi (18 June 1912 – 6 August 1964) was a Finnish shot putter who won a silver medal at the 1934 European Championships. He competed at the 1936 Summer Olympics and finished in 13th place.

References

1912 births
1964 deaths
Finnish male shot putters
Olympic athletes of Finland
Athletes (track and field) at the 1936 Summer Olympics
European Athletics Championships medalists
Sportspeople from Jyväskylä
20th-century Finnish people